Justin Vaughn (born June 3, 1994) is a former Canadian football defensive lineman who played in the Canadian Football League (CFL). He played college football at Fordham University.

Professional career
Vaughn was drafted in the fifth round, 38th overall by the Tiger-Cats in the 2017 CFL Draft.

Vaughn appeared in all 18 games for the Tiger-Cats in his rookie season, recording 12 tackles and two sacks. In 2018, he appeared in six games in 2018 with three tackles before suffering a season ending injury. Vaughn was cut by the Tiger-Cats at the end of training camp for the 2019 season.

Personal life
Vaughn's father, Mike, played running back for Tiger-Cats, appearing in one game during the 1989 season.

References

External links
Tiger-Cats Bio
Fordham Bio

1994 births
Living people
Players of Canadian football from Ontario
Canadian football defensive linemen
Hamilton Tiger-Cats players
Fordham Rams football players
Sportspeople from Hamilton, Ontario